The Citizen Option for Macedonia (Gragjanska оpcija za Makedonija, GROM (lit. "Thunder")) is a political party in North Macedonia led by Stevčo Jakimovski, mayor of Karpoš.

History
The party was established by Jakimovski in May 2013 after he left the Social Democratic Union in protest at its planned boycott of the 2013 local elections. It nominated Zoran T. Popovski as its presidential candidate for the 2014 general elections, with Popovski finishing fourth out of four candidates with 3.61% of the vote.

In the parliamentary elections GROM led an alliance under its own name, including the Liberal Party, the Serbian Progressive Party in Macedonia, the Union of Tito's Left Forces, and the Party of Free 
Democrats. The alliance received 2.8% of the vote, winning one seat in the Assembly.

References

External links
Official website

2013 establishments in the Republic of Macedonia
Centrist parties in North Macedonia
Liberal parties in North Macedonia
Political parties established in 2013